Baron István Dobó de Ruszka (c. 1502 - Szerednye (today, Середнє (Szerednye / Serednie, Ukraine),  mid-June 1572) was a Hungarian soldier, best known as the successful defender of Eger against the Ottomans in 1552. Dobó was a member of the Hungarian land-owning nobility, with holdings in northern Hungary. In the dynastic succession struggles after the Battle of Mohács in 1526, Dobó was consistently on the side of the Habsburg King Ferdinand I rather than that of John Zápolya.

Life
Dobó was the son of Domonkos (Dominic) Dobó, who married Zsófia (Sophie) Cékei in 1498. There were six children from the marriage: Ferenc, László, István, Domokos, Anna and Katalin. István Dobó married his wife Sára Sulyok on 17 October 1550. They had three children: Ferenc, Damján and Krisztina.

Dobó became the commander of Eger Castle in 1549. He became famous as a result of his successful defence of the castle during the 1552 Siege of Eger, in which 2,100 defenders were able to withstand the onslaught of 80,000 Ottoman soldiers. This event was celebrated in Géza Gárdonyi's classic novel Eclipse of the Crescent Moon. As a reward, Ferdinand donated to Dobó the ownership of the Transylvanian castles of Déva (now Deva, Romania) and Szamosújvár (now Gherla, Romania). Dobó was also appointed as voivod (viceroy) of Transylvania in 1553. When Transylvania was separated from Hungary in 1556, Dobó was given ownership of the castle of Léva (now: Levice, Slovakia) in compensation.

Accused of treason against the King, Dobó spent several years imprisoned in the castle of Pozsony (now Bratislava, Slovakia). His health was seriously impaired by his imprisonment, and he died in his home soon after his release from captivity.

References

1500s births
1572 deaths
People from Zakarpattia Oblast
Voivodes of Transylvania
Hungarian soldiers
16th-century soldiers
People from Eger
16th-century Hungarian nobility
Hungarian landowners
Lord-lieutenants of a county in Hungarian Kingdom